Reinier Johannes Maria "Nico" Rijnders (30 July 1947 – 16 March 1976) was a Dutch footballer who played for NAC Breda and Ajax Amsterdam and was part of their European Cup victory in 1971. He earned 8 caps for the Netherlands national football team. He collapsed on 12 November 1972 while playing for Club Brugge against RFC Liège and was clinically dead when he was transported off the pitch, he was successfully reanimated by the club doctor but the incident ended Rijnders' playing career. His health condition was never fully recovered and he died three years later, aged 28.

References

1947 births
1976 deaths
Dutch footballers
Netherlands international footballers
AFC Ajax players
NAC Breda players
Go Ahead Eagles players
Club Brugge KV players
Eredivisie players
Belgian Pro League players
Footballers from Breda
Association football midfielders
UEFA Champions League winning players
Sport deaths in Belgium